Petrovice II is a municipality and village in Kutná Hora District in the Central Bohemian Region of the Czech Republic. It has about 200 inhabitants.

The Roman numeral in the name serves to distinguish it from the nearby municipality of the same name, Petrovice I.

Administrative parts
Villages and hamlets of Boštice, Losiny, Nové Nespeřice, Stará Huť, Staré Nespeřice and Tlučeň are administrative parts of Petrovice II.

References

Villages in Kutná Hora District